Conassiminea is a genus of minute operculate snails, marine gastropod mollusks or micromollusks in the family Assimineidae.

Species
Species within the genus Conassiminea include:

 Conassiminea studderti Fukuda & Ponder, 2006
 Conassiminea zheni Fukuda & Ponder, 2006

References

Assimineidae
Gastropods of Australia